WGTA (950 AM, "Radio La Que Buena") was a radio station broadcasting a Regional Mexican music format. Licensed to Summerville, Georgia, United States, the station served the Rome, Georgia, area.  The station was owned by Azteca Communications, Inc. and featured programming from Westwood One. WGTA surrendered its license to the Federal Communications Commission (FCC) on November 3, 2014.

References

GTA
Regional Mexican radio stations in the United States
GTA
Radio stations established in 1950
1950 establishments in Georgia (U.S. state)
Radio stations disestablished in 2014
2014 disestablishments in Georgia (U.S. state)
Defunct radio stations in the United States
GTA